George B. Hamilton House is a historic home located in the city of Cuba in Crawford County, Missouri. It was built about 1896, and is a -story, irregular shaped, Queen Anne style frame dwelling with Eastlake movement detailing. It has multiple projecting bays and features fishscale shingles and elaborate spindlework in gable ends and porch balconies.

It was listed on the National Register of Historic Places in 2014.

References

Houses on the National Register of Historic Places in Missouri
Queen Anne architecture in Missouri
Houses completed in 1896
Buildings and structures in Crawford County, Missouri
National Register of Historic Places in Crawford County, Missouri